The 2013–14 CBA season is the 19th CBA season. Sichuan Blue Whales were promoted to the CBA, becoming the 18th team of the league.

The regular season began on Friday, November 8, 2013 with the Guangdong Southern Tigers hosting the Sichuan Blue Whales. The 2014 CBA All-Star Game was played on January 19, 2014, at the MasterCard Center in Beijing. The regular season ended on Sunday, February 16, 2014.

Foreign players policy
All teams except Bayi Rockets can have two foreign players, while the bottom 5 teams of last season and Sichuan Blue Whales have an extra right to sign an Asian player. However, Shanghai Sharks waived their rights to sign the extra Asian player.

The rule of using players in each game is described in this chart:

+ Including players from Hong Kong and Chinese Taipei.

++ If teams waive their rights to sign the extra Asian player, they may use foreign players for 7 quarters collectively.

+++ Only 1 allowed in the 4th quarter.

Foreign players

Regular Season Standings

Playoffs
The playoffs of the 2013–14 CBA season started on February 18, 2014. The playoff brackets are shown below:

Finals
The finals of 2013–14 CBA season started on March 19, 2014. Beijing Ducks and Xinjiang Flying Tigers competed for the champions in a 2-3-2 format of homes. Because Xinjiang Flying Tigers ranked higher in the regular season, they hosted Beijing Ducks in the first two games. Beijing won the first two away games. The next three games were played in Beijing with the Flying Tigers taking two out of the three to make the series 3-2 in favor of the Ducks. In the sixth game at Urumqi, Beijing defeated Xinjiang with a score of 98-88 and secured their second CBA Championship.

The scores of the six games are as follows:

Statistical leaders

Individual statistical leaders

Awards

Players of the week
The following players were named the Domestic and Foreign Players of the Week.

References

External links
CBA Official Website
CBA China - 2013-14 Standings and Stats on Basketball-Reference.com

 
League
Chinese Basketball Association seasons
CBA